Group 5 of the UEFA Euro 1972 qualifying tournament was one of the eight groups to decide which teams would qualify for the UEFA Euro 1972 finals tournament. Group 5 consisted of four teams: Belgium, Portugal, Scotland, and Denmark, where they played against each other home-and-away in a round-robin format. The group winners were Belgium, who finished two points above Portugal.

Final table

Matches

Goalscorers

References
 
 
 

Group 5
1970–71 in Belgian football
1971–72 in Belgian football
1970–71 in Portuguese football
1971–72 in Portuguese football
1970–71 in Scottish football
1971–72 in Scottish football
1970 in Danish football
1971 in Danish football
Belgium at UEFA Euro 1972